The Guadyerbas is a river of Spain located in the centre of the Iberian Peninsula. It is the main left-bank tributary of the Tiétar, in turn a major tributary of the Tagus.

Its waters are retained by the Navalcán Reservoir. The toponym is formed by the Arabic wadi (river) and the Spanish hierba/yerba (grass).

References 

Tagus basin
Rivers of Castilla–La Mancha